is the fifth single of Aimyon, and was preleased on August 8, 2018. The song was performed on the 69th NHK Kōhaku Uta Gassen television special. After that, it occupied first place in the Oricon Streaming Chart for 20 successive weeks. It reached 200 million plays on streaming services in February 2020 as reported by Billboard Japan.

Music video 
The music video, showing Aimyon in a shaded room and skateboarding in the streets, was filmed in Shanghai and directed by Tomokazu Yamada. Yamada commented that "Our inner feelings change by the colours and lights of the townscape. We filmed the video to showcase wanting to advance those unchanging feelings toward someone. They become the light, the shadows and the atmosphere."

It has more than 200 million views on YouTube. It was also used in a Japanese commercial for Google Search.

Track listing

Charts

Certifications

References 

2018 singles
2018 songs
Aimyon songs
Billboard Japan Hot 100 number-one singles
Pop ballads
Warner Music Japan singles
Unborde singles